The canton of Saint-Juéry is an administrative division of the Tarn department, southern France. It was created at the French canton reorganisation which came into effect in March 2015. Its seat is in Saint-Juéry.

It consists of the following communes:
Arthès
Cambon
Cunac
Dénat
Fréjairolles
Saint-Juéry

References

Cantons of Tarn (department)